Katharen Ruth Mattera ( Feenstra; born November 17, 1982) is an American college basketball coach and former player for the Women's National Basketball Association (WNBA).

Mattera is one of the tallest players in WNBA history. At 6 feet 7.5 inches (2.02 m) tall, she is the eighth-tallest person to have played professionally in the WNBA. Only Margo Dydek, at 7 ft 2 in (2.18 m), Han Xu, at 6 ft 9 in (2.06 m), and Lindsay Taylor, Zheng Haixia, Maria Stepanova, Liz Cambage, and Brittney Griner, each at 6 ft 8 in (2.03 m), are taller than she.

College years
Born in Grand Rapids, Michigan, Mattera went on to star on the women's basketball team while attending Liberty University, where she majored in physical education.  She was a three-time Big South Conference Player of the Year, a Wade Trophy, John R. Wooden and Naismith Award nominee.  She also became the Big South Conference's all-time shot-blocker on February 14, 2005.  Feenstra was the tallest player in Liberty University and Big South Conference history. She finished her career at Liberty as one of only two players in NCAA history to lead the nation in field-goal percentage in back-to-back seasons (2004, 2005)

Liberty statistics

Source

WNBA career
Mattera was originally selected by the Connecticut Sun on April 16, 2005, during the 2005 WNBA Draft, but was quickly traded to the San Antonio Silver Stars in exchange for the Silver Stars' player Margo Dydek (the tallest player in the WNBA).

On September 14, 2005, she was named to the WNBA All-Rookie Team.

On February 22, 2007, she was traded to the Detroit Shock in exchange for Ruth Riley.

On February 6, 2008, she was selected in the expansion draft by the Atlanta Dream.

Coaching career
On November 5, 2019, Mattera was named assistant women's basketball coach at Liberty University. Her first head coaching job was at Cornerstone University., where she served for six years.

Personal life
Feenstra married Todd Mattera on November 8, 2008. Her sister, Meribeth Anderson, also played basketball at Liberty from 1999 to 2003.

Feenstra wears men's size 17 (US) / 53 (EU) shoes.

See also
WNBA

References

External links
 WNBA player profile
 WNBA draft 2005
 Press release on her trade to the Detroit Shock
 Atlanta expansion draft results/analysis

1982 births
Living people
American expatriate basketball people in China
American women's basketball players
American women's basketball coaches
Atlanta Dream players
Basketball players from Grand Rapids, Michigan
Centers (basketball)
Chicago Sky players
Connecticut Sun draft picks
Detroit Shock players
Henan Phoenix players
Liberty Lady Flames basketball players
San Antonio Stars players
Sportspeople from Grand Rapids, Michigan